Tadeusz Kruszelnicki (born 19 August 1955 in Gliwice) is a professional wheelchair tennis player from Poland. Currently residing in Ziębice, Kruszelnicki has been ranked as high as World Number 3 in singles on 10 April 2006, and World Number 5 on 23 June 2003 in the wheelchair rankings. He has represented his country at every Summer Paralympics since 1996, and has competed in both singles and doubles at all of those Games.

Grand Slam Finals

Grand Slam Men's Singles Runners-up (1)

References

External links
 
 

1955 births
Living people
Polish male tennis players
Wheelchair tennis players
Paralympic wheelchair tennis players of Poland
Wheelchair tennis players at the 1996 Summer Paralympics
Wheelchair tennis players at the 2000 Summer Paralympics
Wheelchair tennis players at the 2004 Summer Paralympics
Wheelchair tennis players at the 2008 Summer Paralympics
Wheelchair tennis players at the 2016 Summer Paralympics
Sportspeople from Gliwice